Thomas Bates (c. 1526–1587), of Morpeth and Holywell, Northumberland, was an English politician.

Family
His heirs were his brother, Robert, and Robert's sons. Married to Isabelle.

Career
He was a Member (MP) of the Parliament of England for Morpeth 
April 1554, ?1555 and 1558.

References

1520s births
1587 deaths
Year of birth uncertain
People from Morpeth, Northumberland
English MPs 1554
English MPs 1555
English MPs 1558